Tymoteusz Klupś (born 26 February 2000) is a Polish professional footballer who plays as a winger for I liga club Zagłębie Sosnowiec.

Career
On 18 February 2018, he made his debut for Lech Poznań in a 2–0 league win against Pogoń Szczecin.

Since coming back from loan at Piast Gliwice in 2020, he remained part of the first team roster but after a string of injuries was confined to only playing for Lech's reserve team.

On 24 June 2022, he joined I liga side Zagłębie Sosnowiec on a two-year deal.

Career statistics

Club

1 Including Polish Super Cup.

References

External links
 
 

Living people
2000 births
Association football midfielders
Polish footballers
Lech Poznań II players
Lech Poznań players
Piast Gliwice players
Zagłębie Sosnowiec players
Ekstraklasa players
I liga players
II liga players
III liga players
Poland youth international footballers
Footballers from Poznań